New York v. Ferber, 458 U.S. 747 (1982), was a landmark decision of the U.S Supreme Court, unanimously ruling that the First Amendment to the United States Constitution did not forbid states from banning the sale of material depicting children engaged in sexual activity, even if the material was not obscene.

Procedural background
New York had an obscenity law that made it illegal for an individual to "promote any performance which includes sexual conduct by a child less than sixteen years of age." Paul Ferber, an owner of an adult bookstore in Manhattan, was charged under the law after he sold an undercover police officer two films depicting young boys masturbating. He was charged with promoting both obscene sexual performances and indecent sexual performances. At trial, he was acquitted of the obscene sexual performance count but he was convicted of the indecent sexual performance count, and the conviction was affirmed by the intermediate appellate court. The New York Court of Appeals overturned the conviction, finding the obscenity law unconstitutional under the First Amendment because the law was both underinclusive as to other films of dangerous activity, and overbroad as to its application to materials produced out-of-state and non-obscene materials.

Supreme Court's decision
The Court upheld the constitutionality of New York's obscenity law, ruling that it did not violate the First Amendment, and reversed and remanded the case.

For a long time before the decision, the Court had ruled that the First Amendment allowed the regulation of obscenity. Under the Court's previous decision in Miller v. California, material is "obscene" if, taken as a whole and applying contemporary community standards, it lacks serious scientific, literary, artistic, or political value, is "patently offensive" and aimed at "prurient interests". The court in Ferber found that child pornography, however, may be banned without first being deemed obscene under Miller for five reasons:

 The government has a very compelling interest in preventing the sexual exploitation of children.
 Distribution of visual depictions of children engaged in sexual activity is intrinsically related to the sexual abuse of children.  The images serve as a permanent reminder of the abuse, and it is necessary for government to regulate the channels of distributing such images if it is to be able to eliminate the production of child pornography.
 Advertising and selling child pornography provides an economic motive for producing child pornography.
 Visual depictions of children engaged in sexual activity have negligible artistic value.
 Thus, holding that child pornography is outside the protection of the First Amendment is consistent with the Court's prior decisions limiting the banning of materials deemed "obscene" as the Court had previously defined it.  For this reason, child pornography need not be legally obscene before being outlawed.

See also

Ashcroft v. Free Speech Coalition, which established that simulated child pornography is protected free speech
List of United States Supreme Court cases, volume 458

References

Further reading

External links

United States Supreme Court cases
United States Supreme Court cases of the Burger Court
United States Free Speech Clause case law
Child pornography law
1982 in United States case law
American Civil Liberties Union litigation